The Corona EXiV is an automobile manufactured by Toyota Motor Company. Released in 1989, it was the luxury hardtop version of the Corona and was introduced to emulate the twin Carina ED. The letters EXiV are derived from the words EXtra impressiVe.  In Japan, the Corona EXiV was exclusive to Toyota Japan dealerships called Toyopet Store locations, and sold next to the Corona. The Corona EXiV and Carina ED share the same Toyota "T" platform as Celica. The Carina ED was exclusive to Toyota Store locations, and the Celica was exclusive to Toyota Corolla Store locations. When the EXiV was discontinued, the Toyota Progrès appeared for the market segment served by the EXiV.

The EXiV's had a hardtop design, compared to the regular Corona Sedan. The Corona EXiV is the sister car, using the same platform as the Carina ED. The hardtop approach was also used on the yet smaller Corolla/Sprinter platform, called the Corolla Ceres and the Sprinter Marino; these cars were offered for consumers who wanted the luxurious approach offered by the Crown hardtop and  sedan, as well as the Mark II (4-door sedan), Cresta (4-door hardtop) and Chaser (4-door hardtop and performance enhancements) but at a lower price and reduced tax liability based on the vehicles size and engine displacement.

First generation (ST180; 1989)

First released in 1989, based on the second generation Carina ED, and also used the same 4S and 3S engines. Within the "Toyopet Store" dealership chain, the EXiV filled the place left by the departing Corona Coupé.

Second generation (ST200; 1993)

In October 1993, a remodelled second generation was released.

References

External links
 GAZOO.com Toyota Corona EXiV（1st generation）(Japanese)
 GAZOO.com Toyota Corona EXiV（2nd generation）(Japanese)

Front-wheel-drive vehicles
Vehicles with four-wheel steering
All-wheel-drive vehicles
Corona EXiV